In the siege of Khotyn (2 July – 19 September 1788) a Habsburg Austrian army led by Prince Josias of Saxe-Coburg-Saalfeld and an Imperial Russian army commanded by Ivan Saltykov besieged an Ottoman Turkish garrison in the fortress of Khotyn. The Allies eventually forced the surrender of the fortress. The siege was part of the Russo-Turkish War.

Siege 
An Austrian army of 18,000 men under Prince Josias of Saxe-Coburg-Saalfeld marched from Bukovina to lay siege to Khotyn. It was joined by a Russian army under Ivan Saltykov. The Turkish garrison led by the Pasha of Khotyn held out for more than two months before capitulating. Under the terms of surrender, any resident of Khotyn who wished to leave could join the Turks, who were allowed to march out with flags flying. The civilian refugees were to be provided with food and given 3,000 carts to move their possessions. This agreement, made by the Austrian generals, was ridiculed throughout Europe as too lenient.

Notes

References

Conflicts in 1788
Sieges involving Austria
Sieges involving Russia
Sieges involving the Ottoman Empire
1788 in the Ottoman Empire
Battles of the Russo-Turkish War (1787–1792)